Angela Dalton is a New Zealand politician who is an Auckland Councillor.

Political career

Dalton served on the Weymouth Primary School Board of Trustees and co-founded the Weymouth Netball Club. While living in Wattle Downs, Dalton was a member of the Manukau Enhancement Initiative (MEI) Steering Committee and the James Cook High School Board of Trustees.

In 2007, Dalton contested the Manurewa Community Board seats of the Manukau City Council, and won a seat on the board.

Dalton was a member of the Manurewa Local Board from 2010 to 2019. In the 2019 local body elections, Dalton was elected as a Manurewa-Papakura ward councillor alongside Daniel Newman, both running under the Manurewa-Papakura Action Team ticket. Dalton became an independent candidate for the 2022 Auckland local elections, winning her seat a second time.

References

Living people
21st-century New Zealand women politicians
Auckland Councillors
Year of birth missing (living people)